Jean-François Champollion (1790–1832) was a French classical scholar, the decipherer of Egyptian hieroglyphs and a founding figure in the field of Egyptology.

Champollion may also refer to:

People with the surname
Jacques Joseph Champollion-Figeac  (1778–1867), French archaeologist and brother of Jean-François
 (1848-1901), French engraver and illustrator
Yves Champollion, creator of Wordfast

Other
Champollion (spacecraft), a planned cometary rendezvous and landing spacecraft
Champollion (crater), a lunar crater
 Champollion: A Scribe for Egypt, a French documentary film
Institut national universitaire Champollion or Jean-François Champollion University Center for Teaching and Research, a French university
Le Champo or Le Champollion, cinema named for the street
, street in Paris' Quartier de la Sorbonne
SS Champollion, French ocean liner built in 1925 and sunk in 1952